Wessonneau may refer to:

 Wessonneau River,  a tributary of the Saint-Maurice River in La Tuque, Quebec, Canada
 Zec Wessonneau, a controlled harvesting zone in La Tuque, Quebec, Canada
 Rivière Wessonneau du Milieu, a tributary of the Wessonneau North River in La Tuque, Quebec, Canada